The extensor hallucis brevis is a muscle on the top of the foot that helps to extend the big toe.

Structure

The extensor hallucis brevis is essentially the medial part of the extensor digitorum brevis muscle.  Some anatomists have debated whether these two muscles are distinct entities.

The extensor hallucis brevis arises from the calcaneus and inserts on the proximal phalanx of the digit 1 (the big toe).

Nerve supply
Nerve supplied by lateral terminal branch of Deep Peroneal Nerve (deep fibular nerve) (proximal sciatic branches S1, S2). Same innervation of Extensor Digitorum Brevis

Function
The extensor hallucis brevis helps to extend the big toe.

See also

 Extensor digitorum brevis
 Extensor hallucis longus

Additional Images

External links

  - "Dorsum of the foot showing the tendons that cross the ankle joint."

Calf muscles
Muscles of the lower limb